This article presents a selected bibliography of Tenrikyo,  a Japanese new religion.

Tenrikyo texts

Scriptures
Nakayama, M. (1999). Mikagura-uta (Tenrikyo Church Headquarters, Trans.). Tenri, Japan: Tenrikyo Church Headquarters. (Original work published 1888)
Nakayama, M. (1993). Ofudesaki (Tenrikyo Church Headquarters, Trans.). Tenri, Japan: Tenrikyo Church Headquarters. (Original work published 1928)
Tenrikyo Church Headquarters (1966). Osashizu. Tenri, Japan: Tenrikyo Church Headquarters. (Original work published 1931)
Tenrikyo Overseas Department (2007). An Anthology of Osashizu Translations (Tenrikyo Overseas Department, Trans.). Tenri, Japan: Tenrikyo Overseas Department.

Supplements to scriptures
Tenrikyo Church Headquarters (1977). Anecdotes of Oyasama, the Foundress of Tenrikyo (Tenrikyo Church Headquarters, Trans.). Tenri, Japan: Tenri Jihosha. (Original work published 1976)
Tenrikyo Church Headquarters (1993). The Doctrine of Tenrikyo (Tenrikyo Church Headquarters, Trans.). Tenri, Japan: Tenri Jihosha. (Original work published 1949)
Tenrikyo Church Headquarters (1996). The Life of Oyasama, Foundress of Tenrikyo (Tenrikyo Church Headquarters, Trans.). Tenri, Japan: Tenri Jihosha. (Original work published 1956)

Studies on Tenrikyo texts

Ofudesaki
Inoue, A. & Enyon, M. (1987). A Study of the Ofudesaki: The Original Scripture of Tenrikyo. Tenri, Japan: Tenrikyo Doyusha.
Mori, S. (2008). A Study on the English Translation of the Ofudesaki, The Tip of the Writing Brush. Agora: Journal of International Center for Regional Studies, 6
Nakayama, S. (1997). A Study on [God], [Tsukihi] and [Parent] (A. Inoue, Trans.). Tenri, Japan: Tenri Yamato Culture Congress. (Original work published 1935)
Nakayama, S. (2010). Thoughts on a Thematic Outline of the Ofudesaki (Tenrikyo Overseas Department, Trans.). Tenri, Japan. (Original work published 1968)
Serizawa, S. (1981). Ofudesaki tsūyaku [Ofudesaki Interpretation]. Tenri, Japan: Tenrikyo Doyusha.
Ueda, Yoshinaru (1948). Ofudesaki kōgi [Ofudesaki Lectures]. Tenri, Japan: Tenrikyo Doyusha.
Ueda, Yoshitarō (2016). Ofudesaki tsūkai [Ofudesaki Commentary]. Tenri, Japan: Tenrikyo Doyusha.
Yasui M. (2016). Ofudesaki o gakushū suru [Studying the Ofudesaki].

Mikagura-uta
Ando, M. (1979). Mikagura-uta kōwa [Lectures on the Mikagura-uta].
Fukaya, T. (1978). A Commentary on the Mikagura-uta, The Songs for the Tsutome (Tenrikyo Overseas Mission Department, Trans.). Tenri, Japan: Tenrikyo Overseas Mission Department.
Hirano, T. (1985). Mikagura-uta josetsu [Introductory exegesis on the Mikagura-uta].
Masui, K. (1955) Mikagurauta katari gusa [Tales on the Mikagura-uta].
Moroi, K. (2016). Teodori no michi [The Path of Teodori]. Tenri, Japan: Seidōsha.
Nagao, T. (2008). Mikagura-uta no kokoro [Heart of the Mikagura-uta].
Ono, S. (1975). Mikagurauta nyumon [Introduction to the Mikagura-uta].
Sasaki, L. (1980). The Tenrikyo Sacred Dance: The Song Text and Dance Movements. Tenri Journal of Religion, 14, Supplement Volume.
Tenrikyo Doyusha (2001). Mikagurauta no sekai o tazunete [Inquiring into the world of the Mikagura-uta]. Tenri, Japan: Tenrikyo Doyusha
Tsutsui, K. (1993). Dare mo wakaru Mikagurauta [A commentary on the Mikagura-uta that anyone can understand].
Ueda, Y. (1994). Okagurauta [The Kagura Songs]. Tenri, Japan: Tenrikyo Doyusha.
Yamamoto, M. (1988). Mikagura-uta o utau [In praise of the Mikagura-uta]. Tenri, Japan: Tenrikyo Doyusha.
Yamazawa, H. (1949). Otefuri gaiyō [Otefuri Outline]. Tenri, Japan: Tenrikyo Doyusha.
Yasuda, K. & Uehara, T. (1987). Mikagurauta: An English Translation in Original Meter. Okayama, Japan: Sanyo Printing Co., Ltd.

Osashizu
Hiraki, K. (1995). Osashizu no o-kotoba kaisetsu [Commentary on Words from the Osashizu]. Tenri, Japan: Tenrikyo Doyusha.
Yamamoto, K. & Nakajima, H. (1977). Osashizu kenkyū [Study of the Osashizu]. Tenri, Japan: Tenrikyo Doyusha.

The Doctrine of Tenrikyo
Fukaya, T. (1983). A Doctrinal Study: The Truth of Origin (Tenrikyo Overseas Mission Department, Trans.). Tenri, Japan.
Nakayama, Shōzen (1957). Kōki no kenkyū [Study of the Kōki]. Tenri, Japan: Tenrikyo Doyusha.
Nakayama, Shōzen (1994). Lectures on The Doctrine of Tenrikyo (Tenrikyo Overseas Mission Department, Trans.). Tenri, Japan: Tenrikyo Overseas Mission Department. (Original work published 1979)

The Life of Oyasama
Nakayama, Shinnosuke (1958).  [The biography of Oyasama]. In Fukugen [Restoration], January 1958. (Original work written 1896).
Nakayama, Y. (1959).  [Lecture on Oyasama's biography]. In Michi no Tomo, February 1959. Tenri, Japan: Tenrikyo Doyusha.
Tenrikyo Doyusha Publishing Company (2014). Tracing the Model Path: A Close Look into The Life of Oyasama (Tenrikyo Overseas Department, Trans.). Tenri, Japan: Tenrikyo Doyusha Publishing Company. (Original work published 1993)
Tenrikyo Overseas Department (2000). Reference Materials for The Life of Oyasama (Tenrikyo Overseas Department, Trans.). Tenri, Japan.

Other publications

Overview

By non-Tenrikyo writers

Greene, D. (1895). Tenrikyo, or the Teaching of the Heavenly Reason. Transactions of the Asiatic Society of Japan, 23(5), 24-74.

van Straelen, H. (1954). The Religion of Divine Wisdom: Japan's Most Powerful Religious Movement. Folklore Studies, 13, 1-166.

By Tenrikyo writers
Nishiyama, T. (1981). Introduction to the Teachings of Tenrikyo. Tenri, Japan: Tenrikyo Overseas Mission Department. (Original work published 1973)
Tenrikyo Overseas Mission Department (1966). Tenrikyo: Its History and Teachings. Tenri, Japan: Tenrikyo Overseas Mission Department.
Tenrikyo Overseas Mission Department (1986). The Teachings and History of Tenrikyo. Tenri, Japan: Tenrikyo Overseas Mission Department.
Tenrikyo Overseas Mission Department (1998). Tenrikyo: The Path to Joyousness. Tenri, Japan: Tenrikyo Overseas Mission Department.
Tenrikyo Young Men's Association (2006). Questions and Answers about Tenrikyo (Tenrikyo Overseas Department, Trans.). Tenri, Japan: Tenrikyo Overseas Department. (Original work published 1990)

Biographies and anecdotes
Nakayama, S. (1964) Hitokotohanashi (Headquarters of Tenrikyo Church, Trans.) Tenri, Japan: Headquarters of Tenrikyo Church. (Original work published 1935)
Nakayama, Y. (1984). My Oyasama, Volume One (Tenrikyo Overseas Mission Department, Trans.). Tenri, Japan: Tenrikyo Overseas Mission Department.
Nakayama, Y. (1986). My Oyasama, Volume Two (Tenrikyo Overseas Mission Department, Trans.). Tenri, Japan: Tenrikyo Overseas Mission Department.
Ozaki, E. (2013). Mind That Attracts Happiness (Tenrikyo Overseas Department, Trans.). Tenri, Japan: Tenrikyo Overseas Department. (Original work published 1977)
Takahashi, S. (1986). Great and Gentle Mother: Yoshi Nakagawa (Noriaki Ryono and Ingrid Seldin, Trans.). Tenri, Japan: Tenrikyo Overseas Mission Department.
Takano, T. (1985). Disciples of Oyasama, Foundress of Tenrikyo (Mitsuru Yuge, Trans.). Tenri, Japan: Tenrikyo Overseas Mission Department.
Tenrikyo Doyusha Publishing Company (2012). The Measure of Heaven: The Life of Izo Iburi, the Honseki (Tenrikyo Overseas Department, Trans.). Tenri, Japan: Tenrikyo Overseas Department. (Original work published 1997)

Church history
Nakayama, Z. (1979). Guideposts (Tenrikyo Church Headquarters, Trans.). Tenri, Japan: Tenri Jihosha.
Tenrikyo Doyusha Publishing Company (1990). A Historical Sketch of Tenrikyo: focusing on the Anniversaries of Oyasama (Tenrikyo Overseas Department, Trans.).  Tenri, Japan: Tenrikyo Overseas Mission Department. (Original work published 1985)

Interreligious/Comparative
Martin, G., Triplett, K. et al. (2013). Purification: Religious Transformations of Body and Mind. London: Bloomsbury T&T Clark.
Tenri International Symposium '98 (2003). Women and Religion. Tenri, Japan: Tenri Yamato Culture Congress.
Tenri University and Marburg University joint research project (2007). Prayer as interaction. Tenri, Japan: Tenri University.
The Organizing Committee of Tenrikyo-Christian Dialogue (1999). Tenrikyo Christian Dialogue. Tenri, Japan.: Tenri University Press.
The Organizing Committee of Tenrikyo-Christian Dialogue II (2005). Tenrikyo Christian Dialogue II. Tenri, Japan: Tenri University Press.

Glossaries
Fukaya, Y. (2009). Words of the Path: A Guide to Tenrikyo Terms and Expressions (Tenrikyo Overseas Department, Trans.). Tenri, Japan: Tenrikyo Overseas Department. (Original work published 1977)
  
Tenrikyo Overseas Department (2010). A Glossary of Tenrikyo Terms. Tenri, Japan: Tenrikyo Overseas Department.
Tenrikyo Overseas Mission Department (1997). Translation Handbook. Tenri, Japan: Tenrikyo Overseas Mission Department.

Theology
Fukaya, T. (1964). Tenrikyō – zenjinrui no saigoni motomeru mono – [Tenrikyo – the last thing that all humanity seeks –]. Tenri, Japan: Tenrikyo Doyusha.
Fukaya, T. (1977). Tenrikyō kyōgigaku josetsu [Prolegomena to Tenrikyo dogmatics]. Tenri, Japan: Tenrikyo Doyusha.
Higashibaba, I. (2009). Sōzō to kyūsai wo tsunagu ronri [The logic connecting creation and salvation]. In Tenken, 11, 137-146. Published by Tenri Seminary research office.
Moroi, Y. (1950). Tenrikyō shingaku joshō [Prologue to Tenrikyo theology]. Tenrikyō kenkyū, 1, 4-11.
Moroi, Y. (1959). Kihon benshōhō toshite no Tsukihi no ri – Tenrikyō kyōri ni okeru 'Tsukihi tetsugakuteki kōsatsu' [The Truth of Moon-Sun as the fundamental dialectic – a philosophical reflection on Moon-Sun in the Tenrikyo doctrine]. In Tenrikyōkō Ronsō, 2, 1-14. Edited by Tenri Graduate Seminary research office.
Moroi, Y. (1965). Dame no oshie taru yuen – toku ni shoshūkyō to hikaku taishō shite [What makes [Tenrikyo] the ultimate teaching – from comparison and contrast with other religions in particular]. In Moroi Yoshinori chosakushū [Yoshinori Moroi collection], vol. 5. Tenri, Japan: Tenrikyo Doyusha.
Nakajima, H. (1992). 'Fukugen' kankaku no keisei to dōkō [The formation and orientation of the sense of 'Restoration']. In Sōsetsu Tenrikyōgaku [Tenrikyo theology overview]. Tenri, Japan: Tenri Yamato Cultural Congress.
Nakajima, H. (1992). Kyōgaku kenkyū no rekishi [The history of [Tenrikyo] theological studies]. In Sōsetsu Tenrikyōgaku [Tenrikyo theology overview]. Tenri, Japan: Tenri Yamato Cultural Congress.
Shimada, K. (2014). The Emergence and Development of Tenrikyo Theology: On the Significance of Sciences of Religion as Mediums. In Tenri Journal of Religion, 42. Tenri, Japan.
Shimazono, S. (1980). Tenrikyō kenkyūshi shiron – hassei katei ni tsuite – [An essay on the history of the studies of Tenrikyo – concerning its emergence process]. Nihon shūkyōshi kenkyū nenpō [Annual review of historical studies of religions in Japan], 3, 70-103.
Tenri University Oyasato Research Institute (1986). The Theological Perspectives of Tenrikyo: In Commemoration of the Centennial Anniversary of Oyasama. Tenri, Japan: Tenri University Press.
Ueda, Y. Tenrikyōso no sekaikan [The worldview of the Tenrikyo Foundress].

Shinbashira's sermons, addresses, talks
Nakayama, S. (2002). My Hopes for the Young: Excerpts from the Second Shinbashira's Talks. (Tenrikyo Overseas Department, Trans.). Tenri, Japan: Tenrikyo Overseas Department.
Nakayama, Z. (2011). Oyasama's Model Path for One and All: Excerpts from the Third Shinbashira's Talks (Tenrikyo Overseas Department, Trans.). Tenri, Japan: Tenrikyo Overseas Department.
Nakayama, Zenji (2016). Sermons and Addresses by the Shinbashira: 2006–2015. (Tenrikyo Overseas Department, 2016, Tenri, Japan.
Nakayama, Zenye (1996). Sermons and Addresses by the Shinbashira: 1986–1995 (Tenrikyo Overseas Mission Department, Trans.). Tenri, Japan.
Nakayama, Zenye & Nakayama, Zenji (2006). Sermons and Addresses by the Shinbashira: 1996–2005 (Tenrikyo Overseas Mission Department, Trans.). Tenri, Japan.

Academic journals
Tenrikyo has been the subject of several articles in the following academic journals:
Japanese Journal of Religious Studies
Japanese Religions
Nova Religio: The Journal of Alternative and Emergent Religions 
Tenri Journal of Religion

Tenrikyo periodicals

Fukugen (復元 'Restoration'), published by the Department of Doctrine and Historical Materials under Tenrikyo Church Headquarters
Glocal Tenri (グローカル天理), a monthly bulletin from the Oyasato Institute for the Study of Religion at Tenri University
Kyoyu (教友), newsletter for Tenrikyo Tokyo Diocese – source of a number of anecdotes quoted in Eiji Ozaki's Mind that Attracts Happiness
Michi no tomo (みちのとも, 'Friends of the path'), Tenrikyo Doyusha's monthly publication
Tenrikyōgaku kenkyū (天理教学研究 'Studies on Tenrikyo Theology')
Tenri Yamato Bunka Kaigi (天理やまと文化会議 'Tenri Yamato Culture Congress')

Other bibliographies
Clarke, Peter B. (1999) A Bibliography of Japanese New Religious Movements: With Annotations. Richmond: Curzon.
Paul L. Swanson & Clark Chilson, eds. (2005). Nanzan Guide to Japanese Religions. Honolulu: University of Hawai'i Press.

Tenrikyo
Religious bibliographies